Pseudotomoxia is a genus of beetles in the family Mordellidae, containing the following species:

 Pseudotomoxia albonotata (Ray, 1936)
 Pseudotomoxia fasciata (Pic, 1931)
 Pseudotomoxia horni (Ray, 1936)
 Pseudotomoxia kamerunensis Ermisch, 1948
 Pseudotomoxia mosseliana Franciscolo, 1965
 Pseudotomoxia palpalis Franciscolo, 1965
 Pseudotomoxia quadrinotata (Ray, 1936)
 Pseudotomoxia rufoabdominalis (Ray, 1936)
 Pseudotomoxia trilineata (Ray, 1936)
 Pseudotomoxia trimaculata (Ray, 1936)

References

Mordellidae